Josef Matoušek (13 January 1906 Hořice – 17 November 1939 Prague, Czechoslovakia) was a Czechoslovak historian who was one of nine people executed by the Nazis for participating in the funeral of the student Jan Opletal.

Biography
Matoušek studied under Josef Šusta. His research focused on two periods: the Reformation and early Counter-Reformation, and modern history. He wrote a book, The Turkish War in European Politics in the Years 1592–94. He also published on Karel Sladkovksý, a 19th-century Czech politician. In 1939, he was a docent in history at Charles University in Prague.

He was active on the administrative Committee in occupied Czechoslovakia. In November 1939 he participated in preparations for the funeral of Jan Opletal, a medical student who died after being injured at a demonstration the previous month. Matoušek was arrested by the Gestapo on 17 November 1939 and was one of nine people to be executed the same day without trial.

See also
International Students' Day

References

1906 births
1939 deaths
People from Hořice
People from the Kingdom of Bohemia
Czechoslovak historians
Academic staff of Charles University
Czech people executed by Nazi Germany
Recipients of Medal of Heroism (Czech Republic)